Antônio Rocha is a mime and storyteller. 

Originally from Brazil, in 1988 he moved to Maine after receiving a Partners of the Americas grant to study in the United States.  He has studied under the mime master Tony Montanaro, and has a theater degree from the University of Maine. He regularly performs at festivals and the National Storytelling Festival.

See also
Storytelling festival

References

External links

Brazilian entertainers
Living people
Storytellers
Year of birth missing (living people)